The Portuguese ambassador in Brasília is the official representative of the Portuguese Government in Lisbon to the Government of Brazil.

List of representatives

References

Lists of ambassadors of Portugal
Portugal